Buddhism is the second largest religion in Malaysia, after Islam, with 19.8% of Malaysia's population being Buddhist, although some estimates put that figure at 21.6% when combining estimates of numbers of Buddhists with figures for adherents of Chinese religions which incorporate elements of Buddhism. Buddhism in Malaysia is mainly practised by the ethnic Malaysian Chinese, but there are also Malaysian Siamese, Malaysian Sri Lankans and Burmese in Malaysia that practice Buddhism such as Ananda Krishnan and K. Sri Dhammananda and a sizeable population of Malaysian Indians.

History

Buddhism was introduced to the Malays and also to the people of the Malay Archipelago as early as 200 BCE. Chinese written sources indicated that some 30 small Indianised states rose and fell in the Malay Peninsula. Malay-Buddhism began when Indian traders and priests traveling the maritime routes and brought with them Indian concepts of religion, government, and the arts. For many centuries the peoples of the region, especially the royal courts, synthesised Indian and indigenous ideas including Hinduism and Mahayana Buddhism and that shaped their political and cultural patterns. However, the Malay Kedah Kingdom denounced Indian religion after the king of Chola from Tamil Nadu attacked them in the early 11th century. The king of Kedah, Phra Ong Mahawangsa, was the first Malay ruler to denounce the traditional Indian religion; he converted to Islam, and in the 15th century, during the golden age of the Malacca Sultanate, the majority of Malays converted to Islam.

Status 

According to the Malaysian constitution, the majority ethnic group, the Malays, are legally defined as Muslim. They constitute 60% of the population, with the remainder consisting mostly of Chinese, who are generally Buddhists or Christians, and to the lesser extent Indians, who are generally Hindus. There are also smaller numbers of other indigenous and immigrants; among the latter are Malaysians of Sinhalese, Thai, and Eurasian origin. Nearly all of the Buddhists in Malaysia live in urban areas, since they are mostly engaged in business or employed in various professions.

Recently, a number of Malaysian Buddhist leaders have responded to the decline in religious participation by the children of Buddhist families, have attempted to reformulate their message to address modern life more directly. Groups involved in these education efforts include the Buddhist Missionary Society Malaysia (BMSM), which was founded by late Ven K. Sri Dhammananda. BMSM leaders have argued that, while many educated youths seek an intellectual approach to Buddhism, an equally large number of people prefer to approach the religion through the tradition of ceremony and symbolism. In response to these needs, religious practices are carried out, but in a way that is simple and dignified, removing what can be seen as superstition. Efforts are made to explain why suttas are chanted, lamps lit, flowers offered, and so on.

As a religion without a supreme head to direct its development, Buddhism is practised in various forms, which, although rarely in open conflict, can sometimes lead to confusion among Buddhists. In Malaysia, some ecumenical moves have been made to coordinate the activities of different types of Buddhists. One example is the formation of the Joint Wesak Celebrations Committee of the temples in Kuala Lumpur and Selangor, which coordinates the celebration of Wesak, a holiday commemorating the birth of the Buddha. An initiative has also begun to form a Malaysian Buddhist Council, representing the various sects of Buddhism in the country to extend the work of the development of Buddhism, especially in giving contemporary relevance to the practise of the religion, as well as to promote solidarity among Buddhists in general.

In 2013, a video of a group of Vajrayana Buddhist practitioners from Singapore conducting religious service in a surau had become viral on Facebook.  Malaysian police have arrested a resort owner after he allowed 13 Buddhists to use a Muslim prayer room (surau) for their meditation at  Kota Tinggi, Johor. The incident has been a frown upon Muslims in Malaysia. It has also become a hot topic in the social media. Following up at 28 August 2013, the controversial prayer room was demolished by the resort management within 21 days from the date of receipt of the notice after much protests by the residents of Kota Tinggi. At the time, Syed Ahmad Salim, the resort owner explained that he had allowed the group of Buddhists to use the surau for a meditation session as he was unaware that it was an offence.

Distribution of Buddhists

According to the 2010 Census, 5,620,483 people or 19.8% of the population identify themselves as Buddhists. Most Chinese Malaysian follow a combination of Buddhism, Taoism, Confucianism and Chinese ancestral worship but, when pressed to specify their religion, will identify themselves as Buddhists. As a result, 83.6% of all the Chinese Malaysian self-identifying as Buddhists. Information collected in the census based on respondent's answer and did not refer to any official document.

By gender and ethnic group

By state or federal territory

Current problems

The rights of religious minorities in Malaysia, including but not limited to those of Buddhists, Hindus and Sikhs, are sometimes described as hindered by the existing legal framework.

Islam as the dominant religion

Islam is the official religion of Malaysia. The constitution of Malaysia declares that Islam is the only religion of genuine Malay people. According to the Ketuanan Melayu doctrine, the bumiputera or autochtonous populations are required to be Muslims, thereby coupling Malay ethnic identity with Muslim religious identity. Apostasy from Islam, whether to irreligion or to another religion, is against the law; however, the conversion of others to Islam is permitted. In fact, according to some sources, the government actively promotes the conversion to Islam in the country. The law requires any non-Muslim who marries a Muslim to first convert to Islam, any such marriages contracted in violation of the law are ipso facto void. Should a parent adopt Islam, their children are automatically declared Muslims without the consent of either parent.

Destruction of religious sites

Several Buddhist temples have been demolished by the government under the pretext of having been built on public land. The land in question is then sold to developers for purposes of gentrification.
In 2014, some ruins of candi (tomb temple) in Bujang Valley were destroyed by an urban developer, causing an international outcry against attacks on cultural heritage.

Notable people

See also

 Ven. K. Sri Dhammananda
 Ven. Pannavamsa
 Ven. K. Sri Dhammaratana
 Ven. K. L. Dhammajoti
 Ven. Sujiva
 Ven. Chi Chern
 Ven. Sumangalo
 Malaysian Siamese
 Sri Lankans in Malaysia
 Buddhist Maha Vihara, Brickfields
 Wat Chetawan
 Malaysian Buddhist Institute
 Vajrayana Buddhist Council of Malaysia
 Buddhism in Southeast Asia
 Bujang Valley, an ancient Hindu-Buddhist civilisation centred on Kedah

References

Bibliography

External links
Theravada Buddhist Council of Malaysia
Bandar Utama Buddhist Society
Buddhist Missionary Society Malaysia
Subang Jaya Buddhist Association
Vihara Buddha Gotama
Young Buddhist Association Of Malaysia
Soka Gakkai Malaysia

 
Religion in Malaysia
Malaysia